Telomer may refer to:

telomerization, in polymer science, which  results in an extremely small polymer—one whose degree of polymerization is generally between 2 and 5
an abbreviation for fluorotelomer
 telomere in genetics